Crunchyroll began simulcasting the series in October 2014, starting with episode 754. In February 2023, episodes of the anime appeared on Tubi, with an English dub, starting at #965. This is the first time since 2010 that any episodes of the main anime series have been dubbed and released in English.

Seasons overview 
These "seasons" are based on the Japanese DVDs released by Shogakukan starting on October 25, 2000. (see Home media release section) In Japan, Case Closed runs continuously on TV with very few weeks off.

Episode list

Season 16 (2007)

Season 17 (2008–09)

Season 18 (2009–10)

Season 19 (2010–11)

Season 20 (2011–12)

Season 21 (2012)

Season 22 (2013)

Season 23 (2013–14)

Season 24 (2014–15)

Season 25 (2015–16)

Season 26 (2016–17)

Season 27 (2017–18)

Season 28 (2018–19)

Season 29 (2019)

Season 30 (2019–21)

Home media release
The Region 2 DVD compilations of the Detective Conan anime are released by Shogakukan and grouped by parts.

Notes

 The episode's numbering as followed in Japan
  episodes were aired as a single hour long episode in Japan
 The episodes were aired as a single two-hour long episode in Japan

References
General

Notes

Specific

External links
 
Case Closed official website at Funimation

2
Lists of television episodes